Józef Gomoluch (18 March 1939 – 2 December 2007) was a Polish footballer. He played in one match for the Poland national football team in 1967.

References

External links
 

1939 births
2007 deaths
Polish footballers
Poland international footballers
Association football forwards
People from Świętochłowice